Daniel Joseph Paille (born April 15, 1984) is a Canadian former professional ice hockey left winger. He was originally drafted 20th overall by the Buffalo Sabres in the 2002 NHL Entry Draft and also played in the National Hockey League with the Boston Bruins and New York Rangers.

Playing career

Junior
Paille played junior hockey for the Ontario Hockey League (OHL)'s Guelph Storm. He was also a member of Team Canada for the 2003 World Junior Ice Hockey Championships and served as Canada's captain for the same tournament in 2004, winning silver medals in both.

Professional
Paille scored his first career NHL goal on January 14, 2006, against the Los Angeles Kings. In the summer of 2007, he signed a one-year, $535,000 one-way contract to remain in Buffalo, then again re-signed with the Sabres the next summer, on July 16, 2008, on a two-year, $2.2 million contract that paid $900,000 in his first year and $1.3 million in his second.

On October 20, 2009, Paille was traded to the Boston Bruins in exchange for a third-round and a conditional fourth-round draft pack. His move to Boston marked the first-ever trade of a player under contract between the two division rivals in their common 39 years in the NHL.

Paille won the Stanley Cup with the Bruins on June 15, 2011, over the Vancouver Canucks in a 4–0 Game 7 victory. He was a major contributor on the penalty kill, as he and linemate Gregory Campbell were instrumental in holding the high-powered Vancouver power play unit to just two goals scored in the seven-game Finals series.

After completing his third season with Boston in 2011–12, Paille was re-signed by the Bruins to a three-year contract on June 1, 2012.

Paille signed with Ilves in Finland on December 2, 2012, during the 2012–13 NHL lockout; he rejoined the Bruins when play resumed in mid-January 2013. On June 15, during the 2013 playoffs, Paille scored the game-winning goal in overtime of Game 2 of the Finals, giving the Bruins a 2–1 victory over the Chicago Blackhawks. Two days later, on June 17, he scored the first goal in Game 3 of the Finals, which turned out to be the game-winner in the Bruins' 2–0 win over Chicago. Despite taking a 2–1 series lead, the Bruins would ultimately lose the series, 4–2.

On April 13, 2015, the Bruins, after missing the playoffs for the first time in nine years, informed Paille that they would not be offering him a contract extension, which made him an unrestricted free agent on July 1, 2015.

On September 13, 2015, the Chicago Blackhawks invited Paille to attend their training camp on a Professional Tryout agreement. He was subsequently released by the Blackhawks on September 28. The following day Paille signed a professional tryout with the Rockford IceHogs, Chicago's American Hockey League affiliate. Paille appeared in 31 games with the IceHogs, before he was signed to one-year contract for the remainder of the season to add depth to the New York Rangers on January 21, 2016. On April 20, 2016, Paille was recalled by the New York Rangers from the team's AHL affiliate, the Hartford Wolf Pack.

At seasons end, Paille opted to continue his career abroad, agreeing to a one-year contract in Sweden with Brynäs IF of the SHL on May 19, 2016.

During his second season with Brynäs in 2017–18, Paille posted 5 points in 14 appearances to begin the campaign before his career was effectively ended through injury, after receiving a blindside hit from Thomas Larkin in  a Champions Hockey League game against German club, Adler Mannheim, on November 8 2017. After suffering three earlier concussions from his tenure in the NHL, Paille was ruled out from the remainder of the season and returned to North America.

Personal life 
Paille was raised in Welland, Ontario. He attended to Saint François Elementary School and École Secondaire Confédération. Paille played his minor hockey with his hometown Welland Tigers of the Ontario Minor Hockey Association (OMHA)'s South Central AAA league. His teammates growing up in Welland included several future NHLers, including Nathan Horton, Daniel Girardi, Andre Deveaux and Matt Ellis. He admired Steve Yzerman when he was growing up. In 2009, Paille married his longtime girlfriend, Dana Goretsas.

Career statistics

Regular season and playoffs

International

References

External links

1984 births
Boston Bruins players
Brynäs IF players
Buffalo Sabres draft picks
Buffalo Sabres players
Canadian ice hockey left wingers
Franco-Ontarian people
Guelph Storm players
Hartford Wolf Pack players
Ice hockey people from Ontario
Ilves players
Living people
National Hockey League first-round draft picks
New York Rangers players
Rochester Americans players
Rockford IceHogs (AHL) players
Sportspeople from Welland
Stanley Cup champions
Canadian expatriate ice hockey players in Finland
Canadian expatriate ice hockey players in Sweden